The Government College of Engineering , Bargur is an engineering college in the Krishnagiri district of Tamil Nadu, India.

History 
The Government College of Engineering was started in Dharmapuri district in 1994. It started functioning in two of the buildings in Government Polytechnic campus, Krishnagiri. A sum of RS.7.85 crores has been spent on the construction of an Administrative Block, Electronics and Communication Engineering Block, Electrical and Electrical Engineering Block, Computer Science Engineering Block, Mechanical Engineering Block, Library Block and Hostels for male and female students.

The college is one of top among ten government engineering colleges in the state of Tamil Nadu coexisting with nearly 500 plus private engineering colleges.

Location 
It was started on 9 September 1994 and housed temporarily in two buildings of the Government Polytechnic, Krishnagiri.

Affiliation
The college was originally affiliated to the University of Madras. From 1998 to 1999, it was affiliated to the newly started Periyar University.  In 2002-03 it became a constituent college of Anna University which is a statewide centralized engineering university. In January 2007 a bill was introduced to the Tamil Nadu State Assembly to retake the administration of the college while retaining its affiliation to Anna University.

Courses 
The first batch of undergraduate students passed out in the academic year 1998–99 in Electrical and Electronics Engineering and Electronics and Communication Engineering. Later Computer Science and Mechanical Engineering branches were introduced. Post-graduate courses in Applied Electronics, Power Electronics and Computer Science and Engineering are also offered.

Departments
 Department of Electrical and Electronics Engineering
 Department of Electronics and Communication Engineering
 Department of Computer Science and Engineering
 Department of Mechanical Engineering
 Department of Mathematics
 Department of Physics
 Department of Chemistry
 Department of English

Admission
Admission is based on performance in the State higher secondary school examinations. Cutoff is calculated from the marks obtained in maths, physics and chemistry. Candidates are admitted by online counseling TNEA conducted by Department of Technical Education.

See also
 List of Tamil Nadu Government's Educational Institutions
 List of Tamil Nadu Government's Engineering Colleges

External links 
 

Engineering colleges in Tamil Nadu
Colleges affiliated to Anna University
Krishnagiri district
Educational institutions established in 1994
1994 establishments in Tamil Nadu
Academic institutions formerly affiliated with the University of Madras